is an anime OVA by Pink Pineapple based on ELF Corporation Kakyūsei game. The title distinguishes the anime from the similarly titled but unrelated OVA series of the same title, Kakyūsei, also produced by Pink Pineapple, but earlier, in 1995. It had a TV series produced after the success of the OVA. The 14th episode of the TV series was never aired on television. The TV series produced further sequels and spin-offs that were considerably more explicit than their earlier versions.

Kakyūsei games
Originally created by Masato Hiruta, as a spin-off of the Dōkyūsei series.

Elf-ban Kakyūsei OVA

Plot
The story revolves around Mizuho Yuuki, whose best friend Miko has fallen in love with Tohru. Miko is fairly innocent and comes from a strict background so Mizuho tries not to get in the way of their relationship despite her growing awareness of Tohru who is currently boarding with her family, and accepts going on a date with the wealthy Haruhiko. There is also outside interference from Ai, a younger student in their school, who also likes Tohru.

Characters 
Mizuho Yuuki - Voiced by: Riko Sayama (Japanese) - active with a strong personality, she enjoys playing tennis.
Miko Kamiyama - Voiced by: Miwa Yanagihara (Japanese) - innocent, comes from a strict family background.
Tohru Nagase - Voiced by: Susumu Chiba (Japanese) - popular and well liked, he is currently boarding with Mizuho's family as well as being her class mate.
Haruhiko Satake - Voiced by: Toru Ohkawa (Japanese) - comes from a rich family and has strong feelings for Mizuho.
Tatsuya Yuuki - Voiced by: Hiroko Takemasa (Japanese) - Mizuho's little brother.
Ai Minamizato - Voiced by: Minako Sango (Japanese)
Mahoko Mochida - Voiced by: Ai Uchikawa (Japanese)
Miyuki Iijima - Voiced by: Mie Sonozaki (Japanese)
Minatsu Yamashita - Voiced by: Hiroko Kajimura (Japanese)
Reiko Shindou - Voiced by: Ikumi Nagase (Japanese)
Nana Minagawa - Voiced by: Kanoko Hatamiya (Japanese)
Minoru Goto - Voiced by: Mitsuaki Madono (Japanese)
Shizuka Mitsuki - Voiced by: Rena Yukie (Japanese)
Mizuho's mother - Voiced by: Kumiko Takizawa (Japanese)
Dogeza Master - Voiced by: Yoshio Kawai (Japanese)

Sequels and spinoffs
Kakyūsei (TV): an alternative retelling of the OVA series.
Kakyūsei 2 (TV): a sequel to Kakyūsei (TV)
Kakyūsei 2: Anthology (OAV): An alternative retelling of Kakyūsei 2 (TV)
Kakyūsei 2: Sketchbook (OAV): A spin-off from Kakyūsei 2 (TV) series.

References

External links
 Kakyusei 2 game website
 
 
 Kakyūsei OVA site
 
 

1997 anime OVAs
1999 anime television series debuts
2004 anime television series debuts
Drama anime and manga
Harem anime and manga
Harem video games